Sterling Hofrichter (born December 5, 1996) is an American football punter for the St. Louis BattleHawks of the XFL. He played college football at Syracuse.

Early years
Hofrichter attended and played high school football at Armwood High School in Seffner, Florida.

Collegiate career
Playing at Syracuse from 2015–2019, Hofrichter mainly lined up at punter, but attempted four field goals and kicked off for two seasons. Over his collegiate career, he totaled 270 punts for 11,651	net yards for a 43.2 average

Professional career

Atlanta Falcons
Hofrichter was selected by the Atlanta Falcons in the seventh round with the 228th overall pick in the 2020 NFL Draft.

On August 3, 2021, Hofrichter was waived/injured by the Falcons and placed on injured reserve. He was released on August 26, 2021.

Tampa Bay Buccaneers
On December 14, 2021, Hofrichter was signed to the Tampa Bay Buccaneers practice squad. He was released on January 18, 2022. He signed a reserve/future contract with the Buccaneers on January 31, 2022. He was waived on July 29, 2022.

Miami Dolphins
On August 5, 2022, Hofrichter signed with the Miami Dolphins. He was waived on August 23.

St. Louis BattleHawks 
On November 18, 2022, Hofrichter was drafted by the St. Louis BattleHawks of the XFL.

References

External links
Atlanta Falcons bio
Syracuse Orange bio

1996 births
Living people
People from Valrico, Florida
Players of American football from Florida
Sportspeople from Hillsborough County, Florida
American football placekickers
American football punters
Syracuse Orange football players
Atlanta Falcons players
Tampa Bay Buccaneers players
Miami Dolphins players
St. Louis BattleHawks players